Maria Dolgorukaya (died 1580) possibly was the seventh wife of Ivan the Terrible, Tsar of Russia. The marriage (unauthorized by the church) may have been celebrated in 1580. Legend says she did not bear the Tsar any children and was revealed to have a lover after their first night together, when the Tsar discovered she wasn't a virgin. Ivan subsequently had her drowned.

Background
There is no evidence of her existence in primary sources. The first mention can be found in 19th-century Russian literature. Nikolay Kostomarov in 1866 wrote that the notice about her was found by Afanasiy Byichkov in a manuscript in the Imperial Public Library.

Modern historians now have doubts about whether she existed.

References 

|-

|-

1580 deaths
16th-century births
Deaths by drowning
Maria
People whose existence is disputed
Uxoricides
Wives of Ivan the Terrible